Llallawa (Aymara for a monstrous potato (like two potatoes) or animal, also named Llallagua Grande) is a  mountain in the Bolivian Andes. It is located in the La Paz Department, Aroma Province, Sica Sica Municipality. The two peaks of Llallawa lie northeast of Malla Jaqhi.

References 

Mountains of La Paz Department (Bolivia)